Ashura processions in Kashmir mark the Day of Ashura commemorating the death of Husayn ibn Ali in the Battle of Karbala. However major mourning processions have been banned by the Government of Jammu and Kashmir since the 1990s when there was a rise in insurgency in the state. Smaller processions are permitted in some Shia-pockets of the state, including in the districts of Baramulla, Kulgam, Leh and Kargil. However, in the state capital of Srinagar, processions are not allowed along the traditional route–that  begins at Abi Guzar, passes through Maisuma, and ends at Zadibal–and the occasion is often marred by clashes between the mourners and the police.

The government privately cites fear of militant strikes as a reason for the restrictions. Shia leaders in the state, such as Mohammad Abbas Ansari, complain that the restrictions are discriminatory and impinge of their freedom of religion.

References

Islam in Jammu and Kashmir